"Like a Yo-Yo" is a song by Italian singer Sabrina. This song was written and produced by Italian singer, songwriter, DJ and record producer Giorgio Moroder, and was released in February 1989, as the third and final single from the album, Super Sabrina. The song's B-sides "Doctors Orders" and "Sex" appeared on Sabrina's second studio album. "Like A Yo-Yo" was Sabrina's first collaboration with disco-legend Giorgio Moroder and peaked at number-one in Finland. Additionally it charted within the top 10 in Denmark and Spain. In the United Kingdom, the single reached number 72. For the single-release, the song (originally from the 'Super Sabrina'-album) was remixed by the English team of Stock/Aitken/Waterman for 7" and 12" use. SAW had been responsible for an earlier Sabrina's single "All Of Me". Videogram only used the 12"-remix, while Carrere in France used both, but edited the 7"-version. Different picture-sleeves were used for the 7" and 12"-releases in Italy. France (and the UK in 1989) used the Italian 12" design on all formats.

Formats and track listings
 CD single
 "Like a Yo-Yo" (Extended Mix) – 4:27
 "Like a Yo-Yo" – 3:27
 "Sex" – 4:10

 7" single
 "Like a Yo-Yo" – 3:27
 "Doctors Orders" – 3:18
 12" Single
 "Like a Yo-Yo" (Extended Mix) – 4:27
 "Doctors Orders" – 3:18

 12" remix
 "Like a Yo-Yo" (PWL Mix) – 6:37
 "Like a Yo-Yo" – 3:27
 "Doctors Orders" – 3:18

Charts

1 Hit Parade chart – not official singles chart

References

1988 songs
Number-one singles in Finland
Sabrina Salerno songs
Songs written by Giorgio Moroder
Song recordings produced by Giorgio Moroder
1989 singles
Metronome Records singles